is Hatsune Okumura's debut studio album. It was released on September 3, 2008. It reached the 50th place on the Oricon Weekly Albums Chart.

Overview
Arriving a year after her debut,  features her first three singles,  and a b-side, with eight new tracks. It doesn't feature her digital single,

Track listings

CD

DVD
 Koi, Hanabi (Music Clip, Short Ver.)
 Suna (Music Clip, Lip Ver.)
 Honto wa ne (Music Clip, Lip Ver.)
 Monochrome no Sora (Music Clip)

Charts

References

2008 debut albums
Avex Trax albums
Japanese-language albums
Hatsune Okumura albums